Lijiang Subdistrict is a subdistrict in Yuanjiang Hani, Yi and Dai Autonomous County, Yunnan, China.

Administrative division
As of 2016, the subdistrict is divided into six communities and three villages: 
 Lijiang Community
 Yuhe Community
 Jiangdong Community
 Hongqiao Community
 Nazheng Community
 Longtan Community
 Nansa
 Nanhun
 Molang

History
In August 2011, it was upgraded to a town. It formerly known as "Lijiang Town".

Geography
The subdistrict is situated at the central Yuanjiang Hani, Yi and Dai Autonomous County. It is surrounded by Longtan Township, Honghe Subdistrict and Ganzhuang Subdistrict on the northeast, Yangjie Township and Naruo Township on the south, Yinyuan Town on the southwest, and Wazhi Township and Honghe County on the southeast.

Economy
The region's economy is based on agriculture, industry, and commerce.

Transportation
The subdistrict is connected to two highways: the National Highway G553 and G213.

References

Bibliography

Divisions of Yuanjiang Hani, Yi and Dai Autonomous County